Anđela Šešlija (born 15 September 1995) is a Bosnian football defender currently playing in the Bosnian Championship for SFK 2000 Sarajevo, with which she has also played the UEFA Champions League. She is a member of the Bosnian national team.

References

External links
 

1995 births
Living people
Bosnia and Herzegovina women's footballers
Holy Cross Crusaders women's soccer players
Women's association football defenders
Bosnia and Herzegovina women's international footballers